Political Rowdy is a 2005 Indian Telugu-language film directed by Adi Narayana. The film stars Mohan Babu, Charmme Kaur, Prakash Raj, and Abbas. As well as playing the lead role, Mohan Babu produced the film. The film is a remake of the Tamil movie Adi Thadi.

Plot
Vithal (Mohan Babu) is a rowdy who commands respect from state heads like CM. He hates women and remains a bachelor even at the age of 45. Kaveri (Charmme Kaur) is a naughty college student. She grabs the attention of Vithal and makes him fall in love with her. She does it for fun, though she is in a love with another guy (Abbas). Vithal proposes her, but she could not say no to him due to fear. The rest is all about how all ends well.

Cast
 Mohan Babu as Vithal
 Charmme Kaur as Kaveri
 Abbas as Kartik, Kaveri's boyfriend
 Prakash Raj as Pandu, Vithal's brother
 Kota Srinivasa Rao
 Brahmanandam
 Ali
 Tanikella Bharani as Vithal's uncle
 Venu Madhav
 Raghu Babu as Dasu
 Ahuti Prasad
 Aishwarya as Pandu's wife
Vizag Prasad
Vishnu Manchu (special appearance)
Manchu Manoj (special appearance)

Soundtrack

Music composed by Sandeep Chowta.

References

External links
 

2005 films
2000s Telugu-language films
Telugu remakes of Tamil films
Films scored by Sandeep Chowta